The Woolslair Elementary School in the Lower Lawrenceville neighborhood of Pittsburgh, Pennsylvania is a building from 1897. It was listed on the National Register of Historic Places in 1986.

References

School buildings on the National Register of Historic Places in Pennsylvania
Schools in Pittsburgh
School buildings completed in 1897
Romanesque Revival architecture in Pennsylvania
City of Pittsburgh historic designations
Pittsburgh History & Landmarks Foundation Historic Landmarks
National Register of Historic Places in Pittsburgh
Lawrenceville (Pittsburgh)
1897 establishments in Pennsylvania